Aphrodisium or Aphrodision may refer to:
 anything of or related to Aphrodite, a Greek goddess
 Aphrodisium, a sanctuary of Aphrodite in the modern Port-Vendres, Spain
 Aphrodisium, the ancient port of Hippo Regius in Africa, now the Algerian city of Annaba
 Aphrodisium, an ancient port, now the Tunisian city of Mahdia
 Aphrodisium, an ancient city in Asia Minor, site of a battle won by Attalus I
 Aphrodisium (Arcadia), a town in ancient Arcadia, Greece
 Aphrodisium (Cyprus), a town in ancient Cyprus
 Aphrodisium, a sacred grove near Psophis in Greece
 Aphrodisium (beetle), genus of beetles

See also
 Aphrodisius